The 2020 Summer Olympics women's 3x3 basketball tournament in Tokyo, began on 24 and ended on 28 July 2021. All games were played at the Aomi Urban Sports Park.

It was originally scheduled to be held in 2020, but on 24 March 2020, the Olympics were postponed to 2021 due to the COVID-19 pandemic. Because of this pandemic, the games were played behind closed doors.

The United States won the title after defeating the Russian Olympic team in the final, while China captured the bronze medal over France.

The medals for the competition were presented by Samira Asghari, Afghanistan; IOC Member, and the medalists' bouquets were presented by Ingo Weiss, Germany; FIBA Treasurer.

Format
The eight teams played a round robin. The teams placed first and second in the pool qualified for the semifinals. The teams three to six played a playoff. After that, a knockout system was used.

Competition schedule

Qualification

Players

Katie Lou Samuelson originally qualified as the fourth team member of the United States, but she tested positive for COVID-19 and was replaced by Jackie Young.

Referees
The following 12 referees were selected for the tournament.

  Vanessa Devlin
  Shi Qirong
  Su Yu-yen
  Sara El-Sharnouby
  Edmond Ho
  Cecília Tóth
  Marek Maliszewski
  Vlad Ghizdareanu
  Evgeny Ostrovskiy
  Jasmina Juras
  Markos Michaelides
  Glenn Tuitt

Pool

Standings

All times are local (UTC+9).

Results

Knockout stage

Bracket

Quarterfinals

Semifinals

Bronze medal game

Gold medal game

Final ranking

Points leaders

References

External links
Official website

3x3
Women's events at the 2020 Summer Olympics